LGBT Pride marches have been held in the Indian state of Gujarat in various cities since 2013. The first LGBT pride march was held in Surat on 6 October 2013. Since then, pride march in the state has been held in Ahmedabad and Vadodara.

History

2013 
The first pride march in Gujarat was held in Surat on 6 October 2013. The march was organised by LGBT activist Swagat Shah. Over 150 participants from across Gujarat and Mumbai took part. The march started from New Civil Court and ended at Kargil Chowk. On 1 December, a 2nd pride march was held in Ahmedabad. Ahmedabad mayor Meenaxiben Patel was the chief guest and flagged the march. Participants included school students, students from IIMA and parents of LGBTQ people. Manvendra Singh Gohil did not participate in the pride and said one should not be aping the West.

2014 
In 2014, pride march was organised in Vadodara city on 30 November from Genda Circle to Chakli circle. On 29 November,  ‘Best of Kashish’ - a movie package of the best films screened at the Kashish Mumbai International Queer Film Festival- were screened, followed by dance, music and other art performances showcasing local talent of Vadodara at Swastik Auditorium at Ellora Park area . Another march was held in Ahmedabad on 1 December from Bata House to Income Tax Circle. Over 300 people took part in the 2nd pride held in Ahmedabad.

2018 
Pride march was held in Ahmedabad after a gap of 4 years on 24 February. The march began from Kanoria Centre for Arts and ended at Darpana Academy of Performing Arts and was attended by 200 people.  A queer conference titled Sambandh too was organised a day before the march. The city of Vadodara held a pride march under the banner Vadodara Samman Yatra on 1 July. The march started from Dairy Den Circle and culminated at Yog Niketan.

2019 
In 2019, Ahmedabad pride march was held on 24 February from Ankur Char Rasta to the Darpana Academy. A panel discussion SamBandh: Dissident sketches was held as part of the pride celebration.

References 

Pride parades in India
2013 establishments in Gujarat
Recurring events established in 2013
Gujarati culture